Josef Trmal (born 12 March 1932) is a Czech gymnast. He competed in eight events at the 1960 Summer Olympics.

References

1932 births
Living people
Czech male artistic gymnasts
Olympic gymnasts of Czechoslovakia
Gymnasts at the 1960 Summer Olympics
Gymnasts from Prague